Kingston Town may refer to:

Kingston Town (horse) (1976–1991), an Australian Thoroughbred racehorse 
"Kingston Town" (song), by Lord Creator, 1970, covered by UB40 in 1989 
List of places called Kingston
Kingston, Jamaica

See also
 Kingston (disambiguation)
"Jamaica Farewell", a song by Lord Burgess made famous by Harry Belafonte